Goniochloris is a genus of Chromista belonging to the family Pleurochloridaceae or to  family.

The genus was first described by Lothar Geitler in 1928.

Species:
 Goniochloris fallax
 Goniochloris mutica
 Goniochloris pulchra
 Goniochloris smithii

References

Xanthophyceae